This article lists cultural references to Mephistopheles, the fictional devil from Faust and Doctor Faustus who has been used in other pieces of literature, film, comics and music.

Art
 The 19th century Mephistopheles and Margaretta is based on the 1808-32 play Goethe's Faust.

Drama
 1604 – Christopher Marlowe's The Tragical History of Doctor Faustus

 1808 – Johann Wolfgang von Goethe's Faust, Part One
 1832 – Johann Wolfgang von Goethe's Faust, Part Two
 1996 - Richard O’Brien starred as the swanky Mephistopheles Smith in his musical comedy Disgracefully Yours.

Opera
 1816 – Ludwig Spohr's Faust (based on plays and poems by Klinger and von Kleist, derived from the Faust folk tales)
 1846 – Hector Berlioz's "Légende dramatique" La Damnation de Faust (based on Goethe's Faust, Part One, but includes a tragic ending without redemption for Faust, following the Faust folk tales)
 1859 – Charles Gounod's Faust (loosely based on Goethe's Faust, Part One)
 1868 – Arrigo Boito's opera Mefistofele (the most faithful adaptation of Goethe's Faust, Part One; it is the only operatic adaptation to date to include Faust, Part Two as well)

Music
 Mephiskapheles is a New York City-based ska band founded in 1990 with a playfully Satanic theme after the fashion of heavy metal music. The band helped define, then transcended, the ska punk genre. Mephiskapheles' music has diverse stylistic influences including reggae, jazz and hardcore punk, and the band has made several national and international tours since 1995.
 Mephistopheles is mentioned in the song "If You Want A Receipt For That Popular Mystery" sung by Colonel Calverley in the Gilbert and Sullivan operetta Patience, in the lyric "Force of Mephisto pronouncing a ban".
 Marilyn Manson has a song entitled "The Mephistopheles of Los Angeles", from the 2015 album The Pale Emperor.
 The Police song "Wrapped Around Your Finger", from the album Synchronicity, mentions Mephistopheles in the third verse.
 The Radiohead song "Videotape" from In Rainbows mentions Mephistopheles.
 A lyric in the OneRepublic song "Love Runs Out" mentions "Got an angel on my shoulder, and Mephistopheles." However, Ryan Tedder may be referring to Mr. Mistoffelees, from T.S. Eliot's poetry.
 The main character in the song "The Devil's Song" by Marcy Playground is Mephistopheles.
 Additionally, Mephistopheles is also mentioned in the Marcy Playground song "Deadly Handsome Man".
 The band Streetlight Manifesto mentions Mephistopheles in the song "Down, Down, Down to Mephisto's Café" and a demonic character presumed to be Mephistopheles is featured of the cover of the band's album 99 Songs of Revolution and is seen in the window of a café.
 The Strung Out album The Element of Sonic Defiance has a song named "Mephisto".
 Kamelot has written the albums Epica and The Black Halo, telling the tale of a deal that Mephistopheles offers to God (if Mephistopheles can claim the soul of God's favorite man, an alchemist and scholar named Ariel, then he can return to Heaven; if not, then Mephistopheles will be condemned to Hell forever). In fact, the second album in the story has a song titled "March of Mephisto".
 Trans-Siberian Orchestra has written the album Beethoven's Last Night (2000), telling the tale of a deal Mephistopheles offers him (in exchange for his musical works, Beethoven will regain his soul, which was never taken from him in the first place). The album incorrectly presumed Mephistopheles and the devil are one and the same.
 Mephistopheles is a popular brass band 'contest' march composed by Shipley Douglas (1868-1920) of technical complexity, dynamic and rhythmic detail, and melodic variety out of the rigid conventions and structural formulae of the military march. It poses a stiff challenge for any band having more in common with a light opera overture than a traditional road march and as such, is a favourite march chosen by many of the top bands.
 On his 2010 album Heartland, Owen Pallett included an original track entitled "Tryst with Mephistopheles".
 U2 singer Bono created the alter ego Mr MacPhisto for the band's Zoo TV Tour in 1993.
 "The Sins of Memphisto" is a track on John Prine's 1991 album The Missing Years. Memphisto is a blend word of Memphis and Mephisto.
 "Mephistopheles" is the title of the eighth track from the self-titled album by the American death metal band Deicide.
 Mephistopheles is mentioned in the Fugees song "Zealots" in the first verse recited by Wyclef Jean: "I haunt MCs like Mephistopheles" off of their second album The Score (1996).
Mephistopheles is mentioned in the song "bedroom community" by Glass Beach with the line "To the arms of Mephistopheles."
Mephistopheles is mentioned in the song “Call Me Little Sunshine” by the Swedish band Ghost from their fifth album Impera (2022). “Call me, call me Mephistopheles”.
Mephistopheles is represented in the four Mephisto Waltzes by the composer Franz Liszt.
"Mephisto" is the title of the fourth track on Klaus Schulze's 2005 electronic album "Moonlake". It is taken from a 2003 live performance in Poznan in Poland.
 "Mephistofeles" holds the name for an Argentinian proto-doom band.

Film
 One of the antagonists in the 1945 Republic serial film Manhunt on Mystery Island is a resurrected pirate named Captain Mephisto.
 In the 1946 film Angel on My Shoulder, Claude Rains portrays Mephistopheles, who is nicknamed Nick.
 In the 1981 film Mephisto, which won an Oscar in 1982 for Best Foreign Film, actor Klaus Maria Brandauer plays a German stage actor whose abiding ambition is to play Mephistopheles on the stage-but in order to achieve it, he "sells his soul" to the Nazi regime and in effect becomes Faust in real life.
 The original theatrical white-hair theme comic villain character as M. (short for as himself what is stand the name from) was adaptation into on the film Faust: Love of the Damned, Director Brian Yuzna in 2000, released it in American superhero horror film based on the comic book of the same name character by Tim Vigil and David Quinn. also he appears as in the film and portrayed by, Andrew Divoff, who is the major title character version of sinful mysterious villain.
In the 1994 film Faust by director Jan Švankmajer, Mephisto is summoned to make Faust's contract with Lucifer.
 In the 2007 film Ghost Rider, Peter Fonda plays the demon Mephistopheles.
 In the 2018 film Vox Lux, Jude Law's character "the Manager" can be interpreted as Mephistopheles, guiding the main character Celeste after she makes a deal with Satan.
In the 2021 film The Hating Game, during an argument between in movie characters Helene (Sakina Jaffrey) and Bexley (Corbin Bernsen) Helene states "This is what I get for selling my soul to Mephistopheles". Bexley asks "Who", which is answered by Helene with "Read a book, Bexley". The argument was caused by differences in business ethics as they merged their publishing companies together. Timestamp for this is 18:32-18:42 in the movie.

Comics
 Mephisto is a character who acts as a possible version of the devil in the Marvel Universe. Among other feats, he is responsible for turning Johnny Blaze into the Ghost Rider, fathering Blackheart, and imprisoning the soul of Doctor Doom's mother, Cynthia von Doom. He is also responsible for erasing Peter Parker and Mary Jane Watson's marriage from history in the infamous One More Day storyline.
 Mephistopheles is a main character in Soul Cartel, a manhwa loosely based on the Faust legend.

Literature
 In E. M. Forster's short story "Co-Ordination", Mephistopheles appears as a spiritual being opposed to the coordination of mankind.
 In Goethe's Faust, Mephistopheles is the personified principle of negation, betting with God that he would succeed to make Faust turn away from God.
 In the 1939 poetry collection Old Possum's Book of Practical Cats by British playwright T.S. Eliot, as well as in the adaptation of the collection into the musical Cats by Andrew Lloyd Webber, the all-black feline character with whimsical and benevolent magical powers, Mr. Mistoffelees, is named after Mephistopheles. Mr. Mistoffelees is also a main character in the 2019 film adaptation of Cats.
 In The Shepherd's Crown by Terry Pratchett, Mephistopheles is the name of a highly intelligent goat befriended by one of the characters. Mephistopheles is able to count to 20 and use the privy.
 In the fictional works of the Bengali author Narayan Gangopadhyay, a character named Tenida (Bengali টেনিদা) had the catchphrase "De la grande Mephistopheles! Yak yak!" (ডি লা গ্রান্ডি মেফিস্টোফিলিস! ইয়াক ইয়াক!)
 In Dina and Daniel Nayeri's Another Faust series, Mephistopheles takes the form of a beautiful governess named Nicola Vileroy, taking children from their families, offering them deals that involve supernatural gifts and raising them to be highly influential members of society. It is implied that among her charges were Queen Elizabeth I and Harry S. Truman.
 In the Matthew Reilly novel The Four Legendary Kingdoms, a character named "Mephisto", who is a human who has been completely tattooed red, with surgically implanted horns. The character and his ancestors are shown to be the cause of the "Mephistopheles" myth.
 In The Sparrow by Mary Doria Russell, Emilio Sandoz is said to take on the personality of Mephistopheles in order to protect himself from his past experiences.
In Agatha Christie's novel Cards on the Table, a pivotal character named Shaitana, who is described as being 'theatrical', with a 'macabre' and 'oriental' taste, is called 'Mephistophelian' multiple times throughout the novel.
In the Highschool DxD light novel series, Mephisto Pheles is an Extra Demon, being one of the ancient Devils who have lived since the time of the original Devil Kings; as a liberalist, Mephisto has an antagonistic relationship with the Original Devil Kings Lucifer, Beelzebub, Leviathan and Asmodeus. Thus, Mephisto spent most of his time in the Human World where he became famous as the legendary contracted Devil of the master sorcerer Johann Georg Faust. After Faust's death, Mephisto became the chairman of Grauzerberer, a famous Magician Association founded by Faust.

Anime 
 In the animated version of Shaman King, Faust VIII refers to his spirit, Eliza, as Mephisto E during the Shaman Fight, which is playing upon the Faustian legend he is associated with.
 In the Japanese anime Digimon Tamers, Mephistomon is the name of an Ultimate Level Digimon.
 In the show Blue Exorcist, Mephisto Pheles or Mephisto is the zany headmaster of True Cross Academy. While this version is obsessed with otaku culture, he carries several German elements in his spells as well as a fondness for making bets. The anime ending even has a short flashback and several other allusions to the original tale of Faust.
In the show Suite PreCure, the first villain is named Mephisto.
in Puella Magi Madoka Magica, the character Kyubey is a direct reference to Mephistopheles with Homura taking the role of Faust and Madoka, Gretchen.

Television 
Ultraman Nexus features three Dark Ultras as the servants of the show's main antagonist, Dark Zagi. The three Dark Ultras are based around the story of Faustus; Dark Faust, who is defeated by Nexus fairly early into the show's run, Dark Mephisto, who survives his first encounter with Nexus and goes on to become his arch-rival, and a stronger version of Mephisto named Mephisto Zwei. Mephisto Zwei eventually meets his end at the hands of Nexus and a reformed Mephisto, who manages to find the light and achieves peace before sacrificing himself to defeat his stronger counterpart.
 Mephistopheles appears in Hex, portrayed by Ronan Vibert. Mephistopheles serves as a guide to Malachi, but also uses psychological tactics by getting him to do what Mephistopheles wants him to.
 In episode 524 of Mystery Science Theater 3000, Manos' dog is referred to by Tom Servo as "Mephisto".
 Mephistopheles makes an appearance in Xena: Warrior Princess (season 6) episode "The Haunting of Amphipolis".
 Mephistopheles is portrayed by Steve Pemberton in season 6, episode 5 of Inside No. 9, "How Do You Plead?", although humorously referred to by Reece Shearsmith’s character as "Mr Mistoffeles".
 Mephistopheles is portrayed by Jon Lovitz in a 1986 Saturday Night Live skit as a defendant in The People's Court, during which he attempts to have a pact with Vonda Braithwaite, the owner of a hairdressing salon, enforced, plus court costs awarded.

Video games 
 In Devil May Cry 4 Mephisto appears as a common enemy. The game also feature an enemy similar to Mephisto called Faust.
 In the Diablo game series, Mephisto is the Lord of Hatred and is one of the Three Prime Evils of the game.
 In Demon's Souls, Mephistopheles is a female non-player character (NPC) who tasks the player with assassinating other key NPCs in the game.
 In Fate/Grand Order, Mephistopheles is a Caster-class Servant and a minor antagonist in the London story chapter.
 In Sonic the Hedgehog (2006), the main antagonist is a shadowy demon named Mephiles the Dark, who spends a large part of the game manipulating the heroes.
 In Neverwinter Nights: Hordes of the Underdark, Mephistopheles is the main antagonist and the final boss.
 In Call of Duty: Infinite Warfare, Mephistopheles appears as the main antagonist and final boss in the Zombies mode.
 In Digimon Story: Cyber Sleuth, a Digimon of the Growlmon species goes by the name Mephisto and possesses a hacker.
 In Animamundi: Dark Alchemist, the main character makes a contract with Mephistopheles to save his beheaded sister.
 In Shining in the Darkness the main villain in the Japanese version of the game is called "Mephisto". In the English version, his name is changed to Dark Sol, presumably in an attempt to link the game to Shining Force II.
In the Shin Megami Tensei games, Mephisto features multiple times as a minor antagonist, more specifically in  Devil Children Fire Book and Last Bible. In Shin Megami Tensei IV: Apocalypse, he features heavily in a DLC quest "A Trip to Hawaii", where he offers the protagonist Nanashi a contract where he and his friends can be taken to a tropical island forever, with Nanashi able to leave by saying "Stay, thou art so beautiful.", a slightly altered quote from Faust. If Nanashi stays on the island, he will be put into an endlessly repeating chain of events where the only way to leave is to say "Stay, thou art so beautiful.". When he does, Mephisto attacks the player in an attempt to gain his soul. If the player denies, Mephisto will be amused and attack anyway.
In Persona 5, the protagonist's Persona was planned to be Mephistopheles, but was later changed to the fictional character of Arsène Lupin
In Pathfinder: Wrath of the Righteous, Mephistopheles is an NPC that can be involved in the main story and several quests depending on your in-game choices.
In Limbus Company, the titular bus the characters reside in and use to get around the city is named Mephistopheles, and was constructed by Faust, whose E.G.O is called Walpurgisnacht.

Other games 
 Magic: the Gathering features a card called "Chains of Mephisopheles" in its Legends expansion.
 The Forgotten Realms setting of Dungeons and Dragons features Mephistopheles as the Archdevil of the 8th layer of Avernus, just below Asmodeus in rank.
 In Pathfinder's Golarion setting, Mephistopheles is a deity of the Archdevils and rules the 8th layer of Hell

See also
 Deals with the Devil in popular culture

References

Mythology in popular culture
Fictional demons and devils